The Reither Spitze is a mountain in the Karwendel in the Austrian  federal state of Tyrol that, thanks to its location at the southwestern end of the Erlspitze Group, is particularly well known for its great views of the surrounding area from its summit. Its name is derived the village of Reith bei Seefeld, which lies at its southwestern foot.

The Schlossbach, a tributary of the River Inn, rises on the mountainside.

Ascent 
The summit of the Reither Spitze may be reached in a 20-minute climb from the Nördlinger Hut to the south. The Nördlinger Hut is an hour's walk from the top station of the cable car on the Härmelekopf; from the Härmelekopf one can also ascend the Reither Spitze directly via the Reither Joch (sure-footedness required). An ascent from Reith bei Seefeld or Seefeld takes about three hours. From the Seefelder Spitze, the Reither Spitze may be reached on an easy path (sure-footedness required) or directly along the connecting arête, a routed graded at UIAA level III difficulty.

Geology 
The summit of the Reither Spitze and the arête of the Seefelder Spitze are made of main dolomite rock. This zone of the upper main dolomite is surrounded by a ring-shaped zone of oil-bearing and partly fossil-bearing Seefeld beds.  As a result of fish fossils, the oil-bearing slate from this region is also called Ichthyol Slate after the Old Greek word for fish, ichthys (ἰχθύς). These rocks were quarried in various places around the Reither Spitze for the extraction of  Ichthyol. The main quarry area was at the foot of the Reither Spitze southeast of Seefeld in the area of the Reither Jochalm.

References

External links 

Two-thousanders of Austria
Karwendel
Mountains of Tyrol (state)
Mountains of the Alps
Seefeld in Tirol